HMS Vectis (D51) was a V-class destroyer of the British Royal Navy that saw service in World War I and the Russian Civil War.

Construction and commissioning
Vectis, the first Royal Navy ship of the name, was ordered in July 1916. She was laid down by J. Samuel White at Cowes, Isle of Wight and launched on 4 September 1917. She was completed on 5 December 1917.

Service history
Although reportedly completed on 5 December 1917, she was listed as being commissioned on 15 November 1917, prior to her completion. In December 1917, she was assigned to the 13th Destroyer Flotilla in the Grand Fleet.

In early June 1918, Vectis conducted towing trials with the NS-class airship N.S.3 to see if an airship which ran out of fuel or suffered a mechanical breakdown could be towed at speed by a ship at sea. Before the final run, N.S.3 landed on the sea to exchange two officers from Vectis for two of her own crew.

After the armistice with Germany of 11 November 1918 brought World War I to an end, Vectis was incorporated into a new 3rd Destroyer Division, 2nd Destroyer Flotilla, in the spring of 1919. With the new formation, she took part during 1919 in the British campaign in the Baltic Sea against Bolshevik forces during the Russian Civil War.

Vectis was among the ships which accompanied the battlecruisers  and  during their visit to Scandinavian ports in June 1920. During the voyage, she and the destroyer  tested the Royal Navys High Speed Mine Sweep, which the British Admiralty hoped to use in the shallow waters of the Baltic in the event of a war with Bolshevik Russia (soon to become the Soviet Union). In a blow to the Admiraltys plans, both destroyers lost their minesweeping apparatus, demonstrating the High Speed Mine Sweep to be impractical in shallow water.

Vectis recommissioned on 27 August 1920. The ships crossed the North Sea and transited the Kaiser Wilhelm Canal to enter the Baltic, where they called at Danzig in the Free City of Danzig; Memel in the Klaipėda Region; Liepāja, Latvia; Riga, Latvia; Tallinn, Estonia; Helsinki, Finland; Stockholm, Sweden; Copenhagen, Denmark; Gothenburg, Sweden; and Kristiania, Norway, before crossing the North Sea and ending the voyage at Port Edgar, Scotland, on 15 October 1921.

Vectis recommissioned at Devonport on 4 December 1923. By March 1925 she was operating as part of the 9th Destroyer Flotilla in the Atlantic Fleet. She recommissioned with a reserve crew on 23 November 1925.

Vectis recommissioned on 31 January 1927 for service with the 7th Destroyer Flotilla in the Atlantic Fleet. She underwent a re-tubing of her boilers at Sheerness Dockyard, and it was completed on 1 March 1927. She again recommissioned on 1 April 1928.

Final disposition
In 1936, Cunard White Star retired Majestic and sold her to Thos. W. Ward for scrapping, but because of legal requirements imposed under the agreement transferring Majestic to the United Kingdom as a war prize, the British government instead took control of Majestic and assigned her to the Royal Navy. To pay Thos W Ward for Majestic, the Royal Navy agreed to transfer 24 old destroyers with a combined scrap value equivalent to that of Majestic to Thos. W. Ward for scrapping. Vectis was among these, and her transfer to Thos W Ward for scrapping took place on 25 August 1936. She was scrapped at Inverkeithing, Scotland.

Notes

Bibliography
 
 
 
 
 
 
 
 

 

V and W-class destroyers of the Royal Navy
Ships built on the Isle of Wight
1917 ships
World War I destroyers of the United Kingdom